Bjerke Idrettslag is a Norwegian sports club from Nannestad, Akershus. It has sections for association football, skiing and biathlon.

It was founded on 15 March 1936 as Bjerke AIL, a team in Arbeidernes Idrettsforbund. It had a certain predecessor in Bjerke SK, which existed from 1896 to 1935.

The men's football team is now a part of Nannestad FK, founded in 2009. Bjerke IL last played in the Norwegian Second Division in 1998.

Coach
1997-2000 Jørgen Neumann, as player-manager

References

External links
 Official site 

Football clubs in Norway
Sport in Akershus
Association football clubs established in 1936
Arbeidernes Idrettsforbund
1936 establishments in Norway